Robert Michell (10 April 1653 – 1 August 1729) was an MP for Petersfield during the late 17th and early 18th centuries.

Michell was born at Warnham, the son of Edwin Michell and Mary née Middleton. On 12 August 1675 he married Margaret White: they had two sons. Mary died in May 1679; and he later married Jane Bold, daughter of Arthur Bold, MP. His third wife was Theodosia Montagu, daughter of George Montagu, MP: they had one daughter.

References

People from Warnham
17th-century English people
English MPs 1689–1690
English MPs 1690–1695
English MPs 1695–1698
English MPs 1701–1702
1653 births
1729 deaths